Mon, MON or Mon. may refer to:

Places
 Mon State, a subdivision of Myanmar
 Mon, India, a town in Nagaland
 Mon district, Nagaland
 Mon, Raebareli, a village in Uttar Pradesh, India
 Mon, Switzerland, a village in the Canton of Grisons
 Anglesey, an island and county of Wales
 Møn, an island of Denmark
 Monongahela River, US or "The Mon"

Peoples and languages
 Mon people, an ethnic group from Burma
 Mon language, spoken in Burma and Thailand
 Mon–Khmer languages, a large language family of Mainland Southeast Asia
 Mongolian language (ISO 639 code), official language of Mongolia
 Alisa Mon, Russian singer

Other uses
 Mon (emblem), Japanese family heraldic symbols
 Mon (architecture), gates at Buddhist temples, Shinto shrines and castles in Japan
 Mon (boat), a traditional war canoe of the North Solomons
 Mon (currency), a currency used in Japan until 1870
 Môn FM, a radio station serving Anglesey, Wales
 The Gate (novel), a 1910 novel by Natsume Sōseki
 .мон, Internet country code top-level domain for Mongolia

Abbreviations
 Member of the Order of the Niger, national honour
 Ministry of National Defence (Poland)
 Mixed oxides of nitrogen, chemical mixture
 Monaco, IOC country code
 Monarch Airlines (IATA code), a British airline
 Monday, abbreviated Mon.
 Mongolia, UNDP country code
 Monmouthshire (ISO 3166 code GB-MON), a Welsh local government area
 Monmouthshire (historic) (Chapman code), a Welsh historic county
 Monoceros, a constellation
 Monon Railroad (reporting mark), a former railroad in Indiana
 Monsanto, NYSE
MON 810, a Monsanto genetically modified crop
MON 863, a Monsanto genetically modified crop
 Motor octane number, an octane rating for petrol/gasoline
 Music On! TV, M-On, a Japanese TV channel

See also
 Mons (disambiguation)
 Japanese mon (disambiguation)
 文 (disambiguation)

Language and nationality disambiguation pages